Justice Carlton may refer to:

J. Phil Carlton (born 1938), associate justice of the North Carolina Supreme Court
Vassar B. Carlton (1912–2005), associate justice of the Florida Supreme Court